Gilgandra Shire is a local government area in the Orana region of New South Wales, Australia. The Shire is located adjacent to the junction of the Newell, Oxley and Castlereagh highways and can be reached in about six hours by car from Sydney CBD. The Shire lies on the Castlereagh River and includes part of the Warrumbungles National Park. The shire was constituted in 1906.

The Mayor of Gilgandra Shire Council is Cr. Doug Batten, an independent politician.

Settlements and geography
Gilgandra Shire includes Gilgandra, Balladoran and Curban.

The geography of the Gilgandra Shire is very flat. The soil is composed mostly of sand, making it very porous and difficult to grow certain plants. The weather is hot and dry, reaching  for consecutive days during summer.

Demographics

Heritage listings
Gilgandra Shire has a number of heritage-listed sites, including:
 East Coonamble Road, Curban: Corduroy Road Ruin Historic Site
 Myrtle Street, Gilgandra: St Ambrose Church

Council

Current composition and election method
Gilgandra Shire Council is composed of nine councillors elected proportionally as a single ward. All councillors are elected for a fixed four-year term of office. The mayor is elected by the councillors at the first meeting of the council. The most recent election was held on 10 September 2016, and the makeup of the council is as follows:

The current Council, elected in 2016, in order of election, is:

References

 
Local government areas of New South Wales
Newell Highway